La Trinitaria is a town and one of the 119 Municipalities of Chiapas, in southern Mexico. 

As of 2010, the municipality had a total population of 72,769, up from 59,686 as of 2005. It covers an area of 1840.7 km².

As of 2010, the town of La Trinitaria had a population of 9,042. Other than the town of La Trinitaria, the municipality had 585 localities, the largest of which (with 2010 populations in parentheses) were: Lázaro Cárdenas (3,699), José María Morelos (2,601), La Esperanza (2,549), classified as urban, and El Porvenir Agrarista (2,468), Miguel Hidalgo (2,428), Rodulfo Figueroa (2,321), Las Delicias (2,121), La Gloria (1,874), Álvaro Obregón (1,790), Tziscao (1,562), El Progreso (1,399), Santa Rita (1,389), Nueva Libertad (El Colorado) (1,182), Chihuahua (1,088), and Unión Juárez (1,050), classified as rural.

References

Municipalities of Chiapas